Salgótarján is a district in north-eastern part of Nógrád County. Salgótarján is also the name of the town where the district seat is found. The district is located in the Northern Hungary Statistical Region.

Geography 
Salgótarján District borders with the Slovakian region of Banská Bystrica to the north, Ózd District (Borsod-Abaúj-Zemplén County) and Bátonyterenye District to the southeast, Pásztó District to the south, Szécsény District to the west. The number of the inhabited places in Salgótarján District is 29.

Municipalities 
The district has 1 urban county and 28 villages.
(ordered by population, as of 1 January 2013)

The bolded municipality is the city.

Demographics

In 2011, it had a population of 64,601 and the population density was 123/km².

Ethnicity
Besides the Hungarian majority, the main minorities are the Roma (approx. 5,500), Slovak (400) and German (200).

Total population (2011 census): 64,601
Ethnic groups (2011 census): Identified themselves: 62,958 persons:
Hungarians: 56,484 (89.72%)
Gypsies: 5,383 (8.55%)
Others and indefinable: 1,091 (1.73%)
Approx. 1,500 persons in Salgótarján District did not declare their ethnic group at the 2011 census.

Religion
Religious adherence in the county according to 2011 census:

Catholic – 30,966 (Roman Catholic – 30,846; Greek Catholic – 118);
Evangelical – 1,182; 
Reformed – 1,136; 
other religions – 1,468; 
Non-religious – 12,682; 
Atheism – 750;
Undeclared – 16,417.

Gallery

See also
List of cities and towns of Hungary

References

External links
 Postal codes of the Salgótarján District

Districts in Nógrád County